This Generation is the sixth studio album by Sonicflood. It was released on INO Records in 2005.

Track listing

Personnel 
Sonicflood
 Rick Heil – lead vocals, backing vocals, guitars
 Trey Hill – guitars
 Jordan Jameson – guitars
 Bryan Willard – bass 
 Ben Showalter – drums

Additional musicians
 Jim Cooper – programming, backing vocals 
 Dan Muckala – keyboards, acoustic piano, synthesizers, Mellotron, programming, string arrangements, backing vocals 
 Marc Byrd – keyboards, acoustic guitar, electric guitar 
 Chris McMurty – acoustic guitar, bass 
 Alex Nifong – acoustic guitar
 Paul Moak – electric guitar 
 Tony Palacios – electric guitar 
 Andrew Thompson – electric guitar 
 Joey Canaday – bass 
 Chris Donohue – bass
 Aaron Blanton – drums 
 Ken Lewis – drums, percussion 
 Brandon Heath – backing vocals 
 Jamie Rowe – backing vocals

Production 
 Marc Byrd – producer 
 Jim Cooper – producer, engineer 
 Dan Muckala – producer, engineer
 Skye McCaskey – engineer 
 Tony Palacios – engineer, mixing 
 Jordan Richter – engineer 
 Jeremy Luzier – mixing 
 Mike O'Connor – musical assistance
 Dana Salcedo – creative direction, stylist
 Benji Peck – art direction, design 
 Michael Gomez – photography

Charts

References

External links
 

2005 albums
Sonicflood albums
INO Records albums